Krod Records is an independent punk rock record label based in Berlin, Germany. Krod Records was created in 2015 in Toulouse, France, and it is owned by Jordan Calvi. The label was named Keine Rose ohne Dornen at the beginning and it evolved into Krod quickly. The label currently has 11 active bands.

History 
Krod Records is a French punk rock independent record label created in Toulouse, France, in 2015 by owner Jordan Calvi. Shortly thereafter, Loïc Gauthey joined the team.

In 2016, Krod Records began to work with the French punk hardcore band Fire At Will to release Life Goes On album. They followed this up with the addition of Colour Me Wednesday from London and German band The Deadnotes to release a retrospective ep Anyone & Everyone followed by a full-length album I'll Kiss All Fears Out Of Your Face.

In February 2017, they celebrated their second birthday with a show in Toulouse with Tiny Moving Parts, Trash Boat, Daylight and Skull Soda at Le Cri de la Mouette.

In May 2017, they announced the release of the second album Club Dragon from Hightower. In June, they signed Dream Nails for the release of two singles.

In the end of 2017, they add South Berkeley in their family.

In 2018, they celebrated their third anniversary in Berlin with Daggermouth, Hightower, The Deadnotes and Kill Her First.

Active Krod Records bands 
 Adversity
 Cold Reading
 Colour Me Wednesday
 Dream Nails
 Elm Tree Circle
 Fake Off
 Fire At Will
 Hightower
 Kill Her First
 Prey Drive
 Raincheck
 South Berkeley
 The Deadnotes
 Topsy Turvy's

Previous and affiliated Krod Records bands 
 Earl Grey
 Gibberish
 Makeshift Promise
 Quitters
 Skull Soda
 This Life

Releases

Krod Records Crew 
 Jordan Calvi – Owner/Label manager
 Loïc Gauthey – Label Assistant
 Valentin Guérin - Community Manager
 Thibaut Charmolue - Licensor & Publicist

See also 
 List of record labels

References 

French independent record labels
Punk record labels
German independent record labels
Hardcore record labels